The .32 Winchester Special (or .32 WS) is a rimmed cartridge created in October 1901 for use in the Winchester Model 94 lever-action rifle. It is similar in name but unrelated to the .32-20 Winchester cartridge (which is also known as .32 WCF).

History
The .32 Winchester Special cartridge, like the .30-30 Winchester cartridge of 1895, is necked down from the .38-55 Winchester cartridge of 1884. The .32 Winchester Special (.321 in) differs from the .30-30 Winchester (.308 in) in bullet diameter. More significantly, Winchester decreased the rate of rifling twist in their Model 94 rifle, from 1:12 when chambered for the .30-30 to 1:16 when chambered for the .32 Winchester Special. Winchester used the slower twist to reduce fouling retention  when creating a new cartridge for sportsmen who wanted to reload their own ammunition using black powder and cast bullets.    It was also marketed as something more powerful than the .30-30 and yet had less recoil than the .30-40 Krag, AKA .30 Army. This new cartridge enjoyed only moderate success, and remained hampered by the small selection of available bullets in the .321 diameter. There is a wide selection of bullet types and weights for the .30-30, while the only commonly available bullets in .321 diameter are 170 grain and 165 grain. Also, due to the slow twist of the barrel, accuracy suffered when the barrel exhibited wear.

Performance
Ballistics are similar to the .30-30 cartridge and its .308 caliber (7.62 mm) bullet, but the larger diameter .321 (8.15 mm) bullet of the .32 WS will create a larger wound.  However, given the same weight of bullet in both calibers, the .30 caliber has a greater sectional density, and correspondingly greater penetration. According to Winchester's original claims, the .32 WS has 5-10% more energy than the .30-30 at close ranges, and less at longer ranges due to increased drag due to the .321's greater diameter and reduced sectional density.

Dimensions

See also
 8 mm caliber
 List of rifle cartridges
 Table of handgun and rifle cartridges

References

External links

 Extra Special
 The .32 Winchester Special
 .32 Winchester Not So Special
 An Impulsive Purchase Turns Out To Be A Good Deal
 The .32 Winchester Special Returns to the Model 94 Rifle Line
 
 

Pistol and rifle cartridges
Winchester Repeating Arms Company cartridges